Perennial Favorites is an album by the swing revival band Squirrel Nut Zippers, released in 1998.

The album peaked at No. 18 on the Billboard 200. It achieved gold status.

Production
The album was recorded at Ken Mosher's studio, in Pittsboro, North Carolina.

Critical reception
AllMusic wrote: "Part of the reason [the Zippers] stand apart from the rest of the neo-swing crowd is that they don't forget that there was a bit of menace in the days of hot jazz -- it wasn't a naive, swinging party, there was some genuine hedonism as well." Entertainment Weeklys review called the band "adept but inconsequential," writing that Katherine Whalen's "sleepy Billie Holiday cadences verge on satire." Spin called the album "self-congratulatory, jokey, essentially heartless cartoon music masquerading as 1920s 'hot jazz'." The Houston Press deemed it "a dozen rock-solid originals that represent the band's finest and most ambitious collection to date."

Track listing
 "Suits Are Picking Up the Bill" (Jimbo Mathus)  – 3:04
 "Low Down Man" (Mathus)  – 4:14
 "Ghost of Stephen Foster" (Mathus)  – 3:32
 "Pallin' with Al" (Maxwell)  – 2:41
 "Fat Cat Keeps Getting Fatter" (Mathus)  – 2:47
 "Trou Macacq" (Maxwell)  – 3:17
 "My Drag" (Mathus)  – 3:27
 "Soon" (Maxwell)  – 3:02
 "Evening at Lafitte's" (Mathus)  – 2:48
 "The Kraken" (Maxwell)  – 3:40
 "That Fascinating Thing" (Mathus)  – 2:43
 "It's Over" (Mathus)  – 1:49

 Hidden track: "Berceuse Tendres" – 1:16 [between tracks 11 and 12]

Personnel
 Jimbo Mathus – vocals, trombone, banjo, piano, lead guitar, guitar, percussion, backing vocals
 Tom Maxwell – vocals, tenor and baritone saxophone, gong, backing vocals, clarinet, rhythm guitar
 Katharine Whalen – vocals, banjo
 Ken Mosher – alto and baritone saxophone, guitar, cymbal, Fender Rhodes
 Je Widenhouse – cornet, trumpet, backing vocals
 Stuart Cole – bass
 Don Raleigh – bass
 Chris Phillips – drums, percussion, steel drum, contraption kit, backing vocalsAdditional personnel'
 Andrew Bird – violin, percussion, background vocals
 Emily Laurance – harp
 Steve Watson – pedal steel
 Rick Lassiter – bass
 Jay Faires – executive producer
 Steve Balcom – executive producer
 Clay Walker – Enhanced CD Design, Multimedia Producer, Photography, Video Editor, Video Producer

References

1998 albums
Squirrel Nut Zippers albums
Mammoth Records albums